Barron is a city in Barron County (of which it is the county seat), in the U.S. state of Wisconsin. The population was 3,423 at the 2010 census. The city is surrounded by the Town of Barron.

History
Originally named Quaderer's Camp after local lumber foreman John Quaderer, the name was changed to Barron in honor of Henry D. Barron after the location became the county seat of Barron County, besting Rice Lake.

Geography
Barron is located at  (45.400527, -91.847948).

Barron is along U.S. Highway 8 and Wisconsin Highway 25.

Demographics

2010 census
At the 2010 census, there were 3,423 people, 1,422 households and 829 families living in the city. The racial makeup was 87.2% White, 8.8% African American, 0.8% Native American, 0.7% Asian, 0.8% from other races, and 1.7% from two or more races. Hispanic or Latino of any race were 3.0% of the population.

There were 1,422 households, of which 28.6% had children under the age of 18 living with them, 40.0% were married couples living together, 12.3% had a female householder with no husband present, 6.0% had a male householder with no wife present, and 41.7% were non-families. 33.8% of all households were made up of individuals, and 16% had someone living alone who was 65 years of age or older. The average household size was 2.27 and the average family size was 2.88.

The median age was 39.1 years. 21.9% of residents were under the age of 18; 10.3% were between the ages of 18 and 24; 24.7% were from 25 to 44; 25% were from 45 to 64; and 18.2% were 65 years of age or older. The gender makeup was 50.9% male and 49.1% female.

2000 census
At the 2000 census, there were 3,248 people, 1,389 households and 837 families living in the city. The population density was 1,176.7 per square mile (454.4/km). There were 1,442 housing units at an average density of 522.4 per square mile (201.7/km). The racial makeup was 96.92% White, 0.62% Black or African American, 0.15% Native American, 0.25% Asian, 0.15% Pacific Islander, 1.05% from other races, and 0.86% from two or more races. Hispanic or Latino of any race were 1.88% of the population.

There were 1,389 households, of which 28.0% had children under the age of 18 living with them, 44.2% were married couples living together, 11.2% had a female householder with no husband present, and 39.7% were non-families. 33.5% of all households were made up of individuals, and 18.4% had someone living alone who was 65 years of age or older. The average household size was 2.25 and the average family size was 2.83.

23.5% of the population were under the age of 18, 9.9% from 18 to 24, 26.6% from 25 to 44, 19.8% from 45 to 64, and 20.3% who were 65 years of age or older. The median age was 38 years. For every 100 females, there were 93.4 males. For every 100 females age 18 and over, there were 89.5 males.

The median household income was $33,281 and the median family income was $40,401. Males had a median income of $29,487 and females $19,926. The per capita income was $18,485. About 5.6% of families and 9.2% of the population were below the poverty line, including 6.7% of those under age 18 and 6.4% of those age 65 or over.

Notable people 

 John Anderson, Wisconsin State Senator
 James R. Beckwith, Wisconsin state legislator and farmer
 Ray R. Clark, Mayor of Long Beach, California
 Jayme Closs, former missing person
 Wallace Jerome, turkey industry innovator
 Chris Kroeze, runner-up on season 15 of The Voice
 Charles C. McDonald, United States Air Force General
 Jonathan J. Smith, Wisconsin state legislator and mayor of Barron
 Charles Simeon Taylor, Wisconsin state legislator and lawyer

See also 
 Kidnapping of Jayme Closs

References

External links

City of Barron
Barron Chamber of Commerce
Sanborn fire insurance maps: 1894 1902 1909

Cities in Wisconsin
Cities in Barron County, Wisconsin
County seats in Wisconsin